SS Augustana Victory was built and operated as Victory ship class cargo ship which operated as a cargo carrier in World War II, and Vietnam War.

Construction
Augustana Victory was laid down under U.S. Maritime Commission contract by Permanente Metals Corporation, Richmond, California, Kaiser Richmond No. 2 Yard, on 5 April 1945, under the Emergency Shipbuilding program. She was launched on 16 May 1945 and was delivered to the War Shipping Administration (WSA) on 9 June 1945. She is named after Augustana College in Rock Island, Illinois. Early Victoryships were named after Allied nations, then 218 American cities were picked for names. Next Kaiser and the Navy department picked 150 names to honor American colleges.

World War II
The SS Augustana Victory was used near the end of World War II. The ship's United States Maritime Commission designation was VC2-S-AP3, hull number P No. 2 (755), Victory #755. The Maritime Commission turned her over to a civilian contractor for operation. Victory ships were designed to replace the earlier Liberty Ships. Liberty ships were designed to be used just for WW2. Victory ships were designed to last longer and serve the US Navy after the war. The Victory ship differed from a Liberty ship in that they were: faster, longer and wider, taller, with a thinner stack set farther toward the superstructure and had a long raised forecastle.

During World War II Augustana Victory operated as a merchantman and was chartered to the Interocean Steamship Company of San Francisco. With a civilian crew and United States Navy Armed Guard to man the ship guns. SS Augustana Victory served in the Pacific Ocean in World War II as part of the Pacific war.

Post World War II
In 1948 the Augustana Victory was sold by the [War Shipping Administration to the United States Lines of New York and renamed the SS American lawyer.  American lawyer worked the moving general cargo and US Mail on Trade route 12 (U.S, North Atlantic/Far East) and Trade Route 16 (Atlantic, Gulf/Australasia). She regular traded was the Benelux trade route.

In 1956 she was sold to the American Union Transport Inc. of New York and renamed the SS Transcaribbean.

Vietnam War
Starting in 1961 the SS Transcaribbean supported the US in the Vietnam War (1961-1975) as a Merchant Marine transport. The US Coast Guard Squadron One chartered the SS Transcaribbean and other ships to move 17 patrol boats to the Philippines for Vietnam duty.  SS Transcaribbean was used by the Military Sea Transportation Service (MSTS) to deliver: bulldozers, cranes, steel and cement for use by US Navy Seabees.

Sinking
On 1 May 1963, the SS Transcaribbean was on its way from New York to Bermuda with general cargo. SS Transcaribbean wrecked and was lodged on to rocks on the small Las Cabritas inland, near Isla de Cabras, off of San Juan, Puerto Rico.

See also
List of Victory ships
 Liberty ship
 Type C1 ship
 Type C2 ship
 Type C3 ship

References

Sources
Sawyer, L.A. and W.H. Mitchell. Victory ships and tankers: The history of the ‘Victory’ type cargo ships and of the tankers built in the United States of America during World War II, Cornell Maritime Press, 1974, 0-87033-182-5.
United States Maritime Commission: Victory Ships alphabetical list War II
Victory Cargo Ships Oregon Shipyards Record Breakers Page 2

Victory ships
1945 ships
World War II merchant ships of the United States
Maritime incidents in 1963